Turbo Mountain was a steel roller coaster at Adventure World in Perth, Western Australia, Australia. The ride was closed and removed in 2009 to make room for a HUSS Shot'N Drop tower named Freefall. The ride was originally located in Luna Park Sydney as a standard Schwarzkopf Jet Star 2 bought second hand. When the ride was moved to Adventure World in 1991, the ride's lift hill was modified from a spiral lift hill to a standard chain lift hill due to maintenance.

See also
 Abyss (roller coaster)
 Dragon Express

References

External links
 

Roller coasters in Australia
1991 establishments in Australia